Chang Chunfeng (born 4 May 1988) is a Chinese javelin thrower.

She competed at the 2007 World Championships and the 2008 Olympic Games without reaching the final.

Her personal best throw is 61.61 metres, achieved in June 2007 in Chengdu.

Achievements

References
 

1988 births
Living people
Chinese female javelin throwers
Athletes (track and field) at the 2008 Summer Olympics
Olympic athletes of China
21st-century Chinese women